(born 1935) is a Japanese artist and children's picture book author. He is known for his books and their illustrations. Tejima's illustrative technique is woodblock. Books he has written and illustrated include Fox's Dream, Owl Lake, Swan Sky and The Bear's Autumn.

Awards 

Fox's Dream
 Fiera di Bolognia Graphic Prize (special mention), 1986
 New York Times Best Illustrated Books, 1987
 ALA Notable Book, 1987
Owl Lake
 Japan Prize for Outstanding Picture Books, 1983
 ALA Notable Books, 1988
Swan Sky, NY Times Best Illustrated Books, 1988

References 

1935 births
Living people
People from Hokkaido
Japanese children's book illustrators